Cyperus marojejyensis is a species of sedge that is native to parts of Madagascar.

See also 
 List of Cyperus species

References 

marojejyensis
Plants described in 1955
Endemic flora of Madagascar